The following is a list of the 23 stations of the Tbilisi Metro, in Tbilisi, Georgia.

Akhmeteli-Varketili Line (First Line)
Varketili, literally meaning "I'm kind", is a city suburb to which the station serve
Samgori, literally "three hills", is a district where the metro station is located.
Isani, a district where the metro station is located. The word "Isani" is of Arab etymology, meaning "a stronghold".
300 Aragveli, named in honor to the 300 soldiers from the Aragvi River valley who fell, defending Tbilisi against the Persians in 1795.
Avlabari, a historic district where the metro station is situated. Formerly known as 26 Komisari after the 26 Baku Commissars. The Arab-derived place name "Avlabari" is literally translated as "an area beyond the wall".
Liberty Square, the city's central square to which the station serves. Formerly known as Leninis Moedani (Lenin Square) after Vladimir Lenin the first Soviet Leader.
Rustaveli, named after famous medieval Georgian poet Shota Rustaveli. The Station is located next to the Shota Rustaveli statue, which is located at the end of Rustaveli Avenue, the city's main thoroughfare.
Marjanishvili, located on the street and on the square named after Konstantine Marjanishvili, 1872-1933, a prominent Georgian theater director and playwright.
Station Square 1, a square where the Central Railway Station is located, transfer station to Saburtalo Line.
Nadzaladevi, a district where the station is located. Formerly known as Oktomberi (October) after the October Revolution. "Nadzaladevi" (literally, "taken by force") was a name given to the area along the railway occupied by the workers, in the 1880s, despite the official ban. This district was also known as Nakhalovka, a name which has survived in common speech to this day.
Gotsiridze, named after the engineer Viktor Gotsiridze. Formerly called Elektrodepo ("The Electro-Depot").
Didube, is a district to which the station serves. The name Didube itself means "a large plain".
Ghrmaghele, a suburb where the station is located. The name is literally translated as "a deep spring".
Guramishvili, named so after the poet Davit Guramishvili, 1705-1792). The Station itself is located on the avenue named after Davit Guramishvili.
Sarajishvili, named after the philanthropist David Sarajishvili, 1848-1911.
Akhmetelis Theatre, named so after the theatre director Alexandre Akhmeteli, 1886-1937, who was purged under Joseph Stalin. Formerly known as Gldani after the district to which the station serves.

Saburtalo Line 

Station Square 2, a square where the Central Railway Station is located, transfer station to Akhmeteli-Varketili Line (First Line).
Tsereteli, located on the avenue named after the national poet Akaki Tsereteli(1840-1915).
Technical University, named after Georgian Technical University, located nearby. Formerly known as Politeknikuri Instituti.
Medical University, named after Tbilisi State Medical University, located nearby. It was formerly known as Komkavshiri, i.e. Komsomol.
Delisi, formerly known as Gotsiridze after a metro engineer, Viktor Gotsiridze. 
Vazha-Pshavela, located on the avenue named after the poet Vazha-Pshavela(1861-1915). The station is almost right under Vazha-Pshavela statue.
State University, named after the nearby located campus of the Tbilisi State University.

Vazisubani line 
Work on the following stations began but never finished:

 Rustaveli-2, A transfer station to the third line

 Saarbrücken Square, a square in the Chugureti district
 Lower Elia

 Upper Elia

 Vazisubani, The terminus station located in the same named district.

The following stations were planned and work never began:
Georgian Militiary Road, Digomi Didube 2, 
"EMMG",
Technical University 2, followed by the work in progress stations, and then Varketili 2

Tbilisi
Tbilisi Metro
Railway stations in Georgia (country)